The Höchstberg is a mountain, 616.4 m, in the Volcanic Eifel region of the Eifel mountains, in the German state of Rhineland-Palatinate. It rises within the Elzbach Heights.

There is a basalt quarry on the mountain at a height of about 539 metres above sea level.

Three streams rise on the mountain: the Ahlsbach, the Eppertsbach and the Lessierbach.

Nearby is the eponymous village of Höchstberg.

Mountains and hills of the Eifel
Mountains and hills of Rhineland-Palatinate
Vulkaneifel